Guofang Wei is a mathematician in the field of differential geometry. She is a professor at the University of California, Santa Barbara.

Education
Wei earned a doctorate in mathematics from the State University of New York at Stony Brook in 1989, under the supervision of Detlef Gromoll. Her dissertation produced fundamental new examples of manifolds with positive Ricci curvature and was published in the Bulletin of the American Mathematical Society. These examples were later expanded upon by Burkard Wilking.

Research

In addition to her work on the topology of manifolds with nonnegative Ricci curvature, she has completed work on the isometry groups of manifolds with negative Ricci curvature with coauthors Xianzhe Dai and Zhongmin Shen. She also has major work with Peter Petersen on manifolds with integral Ricci curvature bounds.

Starting in 2000 Wei began working with Christina Sormani on limits of manifolds with lower Ricci curvature bounds using techniques of Jeff Cheeger and Tobias Colding, particularly Kenji Fukaya's metric measure convergence.  The limit spaces in this setting are metric measure spaces. Wei was invited to present this work in a series of talks at the Seminaire Borel in Switzerland. Sormani and Wei also developed a notion called the covering spectrum of a Riemannian manifold. Dr. Wei has completed research with her student, Will Wylie, on smooth metric measure spaces and the Bakry–Emery Ricci tensor.

Guofang Wei was twice invited to present her work at the prestigious Geometry Festival both in 1996 and 2009.

Outreach

In addition to conducting research, Guofang Wei has mentored the Dos Pueblos High School Math Team, which won second place in the International Shing-Tung Yau High School Math Awards competition in Beijing in 2008.

Awards and honors
In 2013 she became a fellow of the American Mathematical Society, for "contributions to global Riemannian geometry and its relation with Ricci curvature".

Selected publications

 Examples of complete manifolds of positive Ricci curvature with nilpotent isometry groups, Bull. Amer. Math. Soc. Vol. 19, no. 1 (1988), 311–313.
 with X. Dai and Z. Shen, Negative Ricci curvature and isometry group, Duke Math J. 76 (1994) 59–73.
 with X. Dai and R. Ye, Smoothing Riemannian manifolds with Ricci curvature bounds, MANUSCR MATH, vol. 90, no. 1, pp. 49–61, 1996.
 with P. Petersen, Relative volume comparison with integral curvature bounds, GAFA 7 (1997) 1031–1045.
 with C. Sormani, The covering spectrum of a compact length space, Journal of Diff. Geom. 67 (2004) 35–77.
 with X. Dai and X. Wang, On stability of Riemannian manifolds with parallel spinors, Invent Math, vol. 161, no. 1, pp. 151–176, 2005
 with W. Wylie Comparison Geometry for the Bakry–Emery Ricci Tensor, Journal of Diff. Geom. 83, no. 2 (2009), 377–405.

References

External links
 Guofang Wei at UCSB
 Seminaire Borel
 Geometry Festival 2009
 Dos Pueblos High School Math Team wins Second Place in S T Yau HS Math Awards
 

1965 births
Living people
American women mathematicians
Chinese mathematicians
American people of Chinese descent
Stony Brook University alumni
University of California, Santa Barbara faculty
Fellows of the American Mathematical Society
21st-century American women